Tanakorn Dangthong (born September 30, 1990) is a Thai professional footballer who plays as a striker for Thai League 3 club Sisaket.

External links
 Profile at Goal

1990 births
Living people
Tanakorn Dangthong
Tanakorn Dangthong
Association football forwards
Tanakorn Dangthong
Tanakorn Dangthong
Tanakorn Dangthong
Tanakorn Dangthong